The 2011–12 Kentucky Wildcats women's basketball team represented the University of Kentucky in the 2011–12 NCAA Division I women's basketball season. The team is a member of the Southeastern Conference and play its home games on campus at Memorial Coliseum—unlike UK's famous men's program, which plays off-campus at Rupp Arena in downtown Lexington. The Wildcats was coached by Matthew Mitchell.

Roster
From the official UK women's basketball site:

2011–12 schedule

|-
!colspan=9 style="background:#273BE2; color:#FFFFFF;"| Exhibition

|-
!colspan=9 style="background:#273BE2; color:#FFFFFF;"| Non-conference regular season

|-
!colspan=9 style="background:#273BE2; color:#FFFFFF;"| SEC regular season

|-
!colspan=9 style="background:#273BE2; color:#FFFFFF;"| SEC tournament

|-
!colspan=9 style="background:#273BE2; color:#FFFFFF;"| NCAA tournament

References

Kentucky Wildcats women's basketball seasons
Kentucky
Kentucky
Kentucky Wild
Kentucky Wild